David Abercrombie may refer to:

David T. Abercrombie (1867–1931), American entrepreneur and co-founder of Abercrombie & Fitch
David Abercrombie (linguist) (1909–1992), British academic and author

See also
David Abercromby (before 1650–after 1700), Scottish physician and writer
David Abercrombie Donaldson (1916–1996), Scottish artist
Abercrombie (surname)